Anton Kade (born 17 January 2004) is a German professional footballer who plays as a winger for Swiss Super League club FC Basel.

Club career 
Having already entered the professional squad in early 2022, Anton Kade made his professional debut for Hertha BSC on the 20 February 2022, replacing Ishak Belfodil at the 76th minute of a Bundesliga game against RB Leipzig.

On 15 June 2022 Basel announced the signing of Kade on a four-year contract. He joined Basel's first team for their 2022–23 season under head coach Alexander Frei and made his debut in the Swiss Cup match on 21 August 2022 as Basel won 5–0 against local amateur club FC Allschwil. Kade played his domestic league debut for the club in the away game in the Stade de Genève on 16 October as Basel played a goalless draw with Servette. He scored his first goal for his new club on 3 November in the away game in the Vazgen Sargsyan Republican Stadium in Yerevan as Basel won 2–1 in the group stage of the 2022–23 UEFA Europa Conference League to qualify for the knockout phase.

Personal life 
Anton Kade's older brother Julius is also a professional soccer player, playing with Dynamo Dresden in 2022.

Honours
Individual
Fritz Walter Medal U17 Bronze: 2021

References

External links

2004 births
Living people
German footballers
Germany youth international footballers
Association football forwards
Footballers from Berlin
Hertha BSC players
FC Basel players
Bundesliga players
German expatriate footballers
Expatriate footballers in Switzerland
German expatriate sportspeople in Switzerland